Poe Ei Ei Khant (born 7 April 1993) is a Burmese actress. She is best known for her leading roles in several Burmese films. Throughout her career, she has acted in over 100 films.

Early life and education
Poe Ei Ei Khant was born on 7 April 1993 in Yangon, Myanmar to parent Thein Lwin, a real-estate developer and chairman of Myanmar Real Property Development Association (MRPDA) and his wife Moe Moe Thein. She is the youngest child among two siblings, having an older brother.

She finished her primary and secondary education at Basic Education High School No. 1 Dagon. She studied law in distance education at the University of West Yangon and then switched to Master of Laws at the East Yangon University. She graduated with LLB (Law) at the University of West Yangon in 2016, and Master of Laws (LLM) at the East Yangon University in 2019.

Career

2013–2016: Beginning and film debut
In 2013, she competed in the fifth season of Eain Met Sone Yar (Where dreams meet) and placed as the eighth runner-up in the final completion. Thereafter she entered the film industry. She made her acting debut with a leading role in the film O Ay Ay O, alongside Lu Min in 2015. She then starred in her second film Myay Thin Nant, where she played the leading role with Myint Myat, film released in March 2016. The film was both a domestic hit in Myanmar, and led to increased recognition for Poe Ei Ei Khant. From 2013 to present, she has acted in more than 100 films and 6 big-screen films.

2017–present: Breaking into the big-screen 
In 2017, she filmed her first big-screen film Black Rose Mission (A Yu Taw Mingalar) where she played the leading role with Myint Myat and Nan Su Oo. The film was directed by Nyo Min Lwin and which premiered in Myanmar cinemas on 6 June 2019. She then starred in action film Original Gangster 3, but the censors not allowed to screen in Myanmar cinema. The same year, she starred in drama film A Htet Tan Sar (High Standard), alongside Nay Toe, Nyi Htut Khaung and Thu Riya which premiered in Myanmar cinemas on 22 August 2019. The film was a huge commercial success, topping film ratings and ranked third on The Myanmar Times "Top 10 Myanmar films 2019".

In 2018, she was cast in the drama series Tu Nhing Maya Tae Myitta, alongside Nay Dway and Khine Hnin Wai.

Selected filmography

Film (Cinema)

Film

Over 100 films, including

Television series

Personal life
Poe Ei Ei Khant is married to Aung Thu, a footballer, on 31 May 2018 and the wedding ceremony held on 26 March 2019 at the Western Park. She gave birth to their first son Thwin Oo Han on 19 July 2019.

References

External links

Films on Burmese Video Directory
Films on Shwe Dream

1993 births
Living people
Burmese film actresses
21st-century Burmese actresses
People from Yangon